Murilo Gouvea (born 15 September 1988) is a Brazilian professional baseball pitcher for Fortitudo Baseball of the Serie A. Gouvea previously played in minor league baseball in the Houston Astros organization.

Gouvea played for the Brazilian national baseball team in the 2013 World Baseball Classic. He played for Team Italy in the 2019 European Baseball Championship. He is playing for the team at the Africa/Europe 2020 Olympic Qualification tournament, taking place in Italy beginning 18 September 2019.

On 3 March 2022, Gouvea joined Fortitudo Baseball of the Serie A.

References

External links

1988 births
Living people
Brazilian baseball players
Brazilian expatriate baseball players in Canada
Brazilian expatriate baseball players in the United States
Bristol White Sox players
Fresno Grizzlies players
Greeneville Astros players
Kannapolis Intimidators players
Lexington Legends players
People from São Paulo
Québec Capitales players
Sportspeople from São Paulo
Tri-City ValleyCats players
2013 World Baseball Classic players
2019 European Baseball Championship players